East Lothian is a constituency in Scotland which returns one Member of Parliament (MP) to the House of Commons of the Parliament of the United Kingdom, elected by the first past the post voting system.

The seat is represented by Kenny MacAskill of the Alba Party who was elected as an SNP MP at the 2019 general election, where he unseated the sitting Labour incumbent, Martin Whitfield with a majority of 3,886 votes.

Constituency profile
The seat covers small towns to the east of Edinburgh including Haddington and Dunbar which have good commuting links to the capital city; and a more rural area extending south into the Lammermuir Hills. Residents' health and wealth are around average for the UK.

History
The constituency was created for the 1983 general election. Until the SNP landslide victory in 2015, it had been continuously represented by an MP from the Labour Party since the constituency's creation 32 years earlier. The East Lothian Constituency Labour Party voted on 22 January 2010 to deselect the previous MP Anne Moffat. The National Executive Committee upheld the decision on 23 March 2010. Fiona O'Donnell was elected in 2010 with an increased majority for the Labour Party compared to 2005. O'Donnell lost her seat to George Kerevan of the SNP at the 2015 general election; who was elected with a majority of 6,803 votes.

From 2015 until the snap general election in 2017, the constituency was represented by George Kerevan of the Scottish National Party; who was defeated by Martin Whitfield of the Labour Party by 3,083 votes. Two years later, at the 2019 general election, Whitfield was defeated by former Scottish National Party MSP and Justice Secretary Kenny MacAskill. On 26 March 2021, MacAskill defected from the SNP to the Alba Party.

At the 2014 Scottish independence referendum, a majority of voters nationwide opted for Scotland to remain a part of the United Kingdom - with 61.72% of the electorate of East Lothian voting for staying in the United Kingdom and 38.28% voting for independence.

Boundaries 

1983–1997: East Lothian District.

1997–2005: The East Lothian District electoral divisions of Fa'side, Haddington, Luffness, Preston/Levenhall, and Tantallon.

2005–present: East Lothian Council area.

Before the 1983 general election, the area lay in the Berwick and East Lothian constituency.

Members of Parliament

Elections

Elections in the 2020s 

 Douglas Alexander (Labour)

Elections in the 2010s

Elections in the 2000s

Elections in the 1990s

Elections in the 1980s

References

Westminster Parliamentary constituencies in Scotland
Constituencies of the Parliament of the United Kingdom established in 1983
Politics of East Lothian